The men's team épée was one of eight fencing events on the fencing at the 1980 Summer Olympics programme. It was the sixteenth appearance of the event. The competition was held from 30 to 31 July 1980. 52 fencers from 11 nations competed.

Rosters

Cuba
 Efigenio Favier
 Guillermo Betancourt
 Heriberto González
 Pedro Hernández

Czechoslovakia
 Jaroslav Jurka
 Jaromír Holub
 Jiří Douba
 Jiří Adam
 Oldřich Kubišta

Finland
 Heikki Hulkkonen
 Kimmo Puranen
 Peter Grönholm
 Peder Planting
 Mikko Salminen

France
 Philippe Boisse
 Hubert Gardas
 Philippe Riboud
 Patrick Picot
 Michel Salesse

Great Britain
 Steven Paul
 John Llewellyn
 Neal Mallett
 Rob Bruniges

Hungary
 Ernő Kolczonay
 István Osztrics
 László Pető
 Jenő Pap
 Péter Takács

Kuwait
 Ebrahim Al-Cattan
 Osama Al-Khurafi
 Mohamed Al-Thuwani
 Kazem Hasan
 Kifah Al-Mutawa

Poland
 Andrzej Lis
 Marius Strzalka
 Leszek Swornowski
 Ludomir Chronowski
 Piotr Jabłkowski

Romania
 Ioan Popa
 Octavian Zidaru
 Anton Pongratz
 Costică Bărăgan

Soviet Union
 Ashot Karagyan
 Aleksandr Abushakhmetov
 Aleksandr Mozhayev
 Boris Lukomsky
 Volodymyr Smyrnov

Sweden
 Johan Harmenberg
 Rolf Edling
 Leif Högström
 Göran Malkar
 Hans Jacobson

Results

Round 1

Round 1 Pool A 

In the only match in pool A, Sweden defeated Great Britain 8–3 (with one double-loss).

Round 1 Pool B 

Poland and the Soviet Union each defeated Cuba, 12–4 and 15–1, respectively. The two victors then faced off. The Soviet Union won 7–5, with 2 double losses and a 64–49 touches advantage making the final two bouts unnecessary.

Round 1 Pool C 

Czechoslovakia and Hungary each defeated Finland, 13–3 and 8–8 (67 touches to 53), respectively. The two victors then faced off. Hungary won 9–1.

Round 1 Pool D 

Romania and France each defeated Kuwait, 12–4 and 16–0 respectively. The winners then faced off, with France winning 9–6.

Elimination rounds

Main bracket

Consolation bracket

References

Epee team
Men's events at the 1980 Summer Olympics